The Polish University Abroad, or Polish University in Exile (abbreviated PUNO), was initially established in London in 1949 (de facto 1952).

The Polish University Abroad has a B.A. programme and does research.  It has outposts in Paris, France, and Munich, Germany.

PUNO is based in Hammersmith, London.  The nearest underground station is Ravenscourt Park (District line).

Rectors of PUNO
 Prof. Tadeusz Brzeski (1951–1958)
 Prof. Cezaria Jędrzejewiczowa (1958–1967)
 Prof. Tadeusz Sulimirski (1967–1978)
 Prof. Jerzy Gawenda (1978–1987)
 Prof. Mieczysław Sas-Skowroński (1987–1993)
 Prof. Wojciech Falkowski (2002–2011)
 Prof. Halina Taborska (2011–2017)
 Prof. Tomasz J. Kaźmierski (2017–2021)
 Prof. Włodzimierz Mier-Jędrzejowicz (2021-2025)

References
 POLSKI UNIWERSYTET NA OBCZYŹNIE (PUNO) w LONDYNIE TECHNIKA I NAUKA nr 72 
 Polski Uniwersytet Na Obczyźnie, Alma Mater, Nr 66-67/2004

External links

  

Higher education in the United Kingdom
Universities and colleges in Poland
International schools in Poland